Wet Dream is the first solo album by Pink Floyd keyboardist Richard Wright, released in 1978.

Composition
Wet Dream was self-produced and Wright wrote all the songs himself, except "Against the Odds", which was co-written with his then-wife, Juliette, who, as Juliette Gale, had been a member of one of the early bands that evolved into Pink Floyd. It was recorded at Super Bear Studios, Alpes-Maritimes, in early 1978.

Release and reception
The album went virtually unnoticed at the time. The album has long been out of print in Wright's native UK, but it was re-released on CD in the United States and Canada in the 1990s, with some success, and again in 2008 in Australia, following Wright's death.

Track listing

Personnel
Rick Wright: piano, electric piano, Hammond organ, Oberheim synthesizer, Solina String Ensemble, vocals
Mel Collins: saxophones (1,3,5,7,10), flute (9)
Snowy White: guitars
Larry Steele: bass guitar
Reg Isidore: drums, percussion
Hipgnosis: Rob Brimson Album cover design and photography

Charts
Album - Billboard (United States)

References

1978 debut albums
Albums with cover art by Hipgnosis
Harvest Records albums
EMI Records albums
Columbia Records albums
Albums produced by Richard Wright (musician)
Richard Wright (musician) albums